Dallas Woods, is an Indigenous Australian rapper and musician. Woods is known for his role on ABC Kids' Move It Mob Style and in 2018 as Baker Boy's support act on his national tour. Woods gained attention by winning the New Talent Song of the Year Award for Baker Boy's track "Mr La Di Da Di", cowritten with Baker Boy, Jerome Farah, and Dion Brownfield.

Early life
Dallas Woods was born in Wyndham, East Kimberley. He left school at 15 and pursued a career as a dancer at Indigenous Hip Hop Projects.

Career
2018: Baker Boy support act and "9 Times Out of 10"

In 2018, Woods released his debut single, "9 Times Out of 10" and featured on Baker Boy's single "Black Magic". He performed at Splendour in the Grass in 2018.

2019–20: "Chapter One" and "If It Glitters It's Gold"

In July 2019, Woods was nominated for New Talent of the Year at the 16th Annual National Indigenous Music Awards. On 22 May 2020, he released the single "If It Glitters It's Gold".

On 23 September 2020, Woods released "Better Days" with Baker Boy and Sampa the Great.

Discography

Albums

Singles

As lead artist

As featured artist

Songwriting credits

Awards and nominations

APRA Awards
The APRA Awards are presented annually from 1982 by the Australasian Performing Right Association (APRA), "honouring composers and songwriters".

! 
|-
| 2019
| "Mr La Di Da Di" (Danzal Baker, Dion Brownfield, Jerome Farah, Dallas Woods)
| Urban Work of the Year
| 
| 
|-
| 2020
| "Cool as Hell" (Danzal Baker, Carl Dimataga, Jesse Ferris, Morgan Jones, Brendan Tuckerman, Dallas Woods)
| Most Performed Urban Work of the Year
| 
| 
|-
| 2021 
| "Meditjin" (Danzal Baker, Jess Bourke, Dion Brownfield, Jerome Farah, Dallas Woods)
| Song of the Year
| 
| 
|-
| 2022 
| "Ride" (Danzal Baker, Yirrmal Marika, Philip Norman, Dallas Woods)
| Song of the Year
| 
| 
|-

National Indigenous Music Awards
The National Indigenous Music Awards is an annual awards ceremony that recognises the achievements of Indigenous Australians in music. The award ceremony commenced in 2004. As of 2020, Woods has received three nominations.

! 
|-
| 2019
| Himself
| New Talent of the Year
| 
|
|-
| rowspan="2"| 2020
| Himself
| New Talent of the Year
| rowspan="2" 
| rowspan="2"|
|-
| "If It Glitters It's Gold"
| Film Clip of the Year
|-
| rowspan="1"| 2021
| "Better Days (with Baker Boy & Sampa the Great)
| Song of the Year
| 
| 
|-
! scope="row" rowspan="1"| 2022
| Julie's Boy
| Album of the Year
| 
| 
|-
|}

References

External links
 

People from the Kimberley (Western Australia)
Year of birth missing (living people)
Living people
Indigenous Australians from Western Australia
Australian male rappers